Rafał Leszczyński (1526–1592), of Wieniawa coat of arms, was a voivode of Brześć Kujawski from 1545 to 1550; castellan of Śrem in 1580, starost of Radziejów, sejm marshal, one of the leaders of the Executionist movement and Polish Reformation.

Biography 
He was an opponent to Zygmunt August's marriage with Barbara Radziwiłłówna (around 1548); also around that time he joined the Czech Brethren and became one of the leading Polish representatives of that faith. In 1550 he resigned his voivode office, and was elected a deputy to the Sejm and later became Marshal of the Sejm. He was a vocal opponent of the Roman Catholic clergy and a supporter of the Union of Lublin.

He was the father of Andrzej Leszczyński.

1526 births
1592 deaths
Rafal
Polish Calvinist and Reformed Christians